Morality Above All Else is a Czech comedy film directed by Martin Frič. It was released in 1937.

Cast
 Hugo Haas as Prof. Antonín Karas
 Světla Svozilová as Karolína Karasová
 Adina Mandlová as Eva Karasová
 Ladislav Boháč as MUDr. Jílkovský
 Saša Rašilov as JUDr. Mach
 Věra Ferbasová as Vera Gregorova
 Zdeňka Baldová as Drázná

References

External links
 

1937 films
1937 comedy films
1930s Czech-language films
Czechoslovak black-and-white films
Films directed by Martin Frič
Czechoslovak comedy films
1930s Czech films